Piyamaradu (also spelled Piyama-Radu, Piyama Radu, Piyamaradus, Piyamaraduš) was a warlord mentioned in Hittite documents from the middle and late 13th century BC. As an ally of the Ahhiyawa, he led or supported insurrections against the Hittites in Western Anatolia. His history is of particular interest since his area of activity may have included Wilusa, thus suggesting a potential connection to the myth of the Trojan War.

Meaning of the name 
The name appears to be a compound with Luwian piyama "gift" as its first part. Other Luwian names containing the same word are attested, such as Piyama-Kurunta.

The second part of the word was earlier believed to be an unknown theonym *Radu, but since Luwian words do not start with an r, it must be aradu, which may be a noun meaning "devotee", derived "from *arada- 'religious community (vel sim.)', itself a derivative of *ara- 'associate' (cf. Hittite ara- 'id.').

The identity and exploits of Piyamaradu 
Piyamaradu's renegade activities are remarkable for their duration, having spanned at least 35 years, during which time he posed a considerable threat to three Hittite kings: Muwatalli II, Hattusili III, and Tudhaliya IV.

Popular conjecture proposes that Piyamaradu was the legitimate heir of Uhha-Ziti, a previous king of Arzawa who was dethroned by the Hittite king Mursili II, and probably the son of his son Piyama-Kurunta, although this is entirely speculative, and he is nowhere referred to as a prince. Bryce and Sommers prefer to describe him as a "rebellious Hittite dignitary".  His attacks and raiding activities on the Hittite vassal states in Western Anatolia of Arzawa, Seha, Lazpa (Lesbos) and Wilusa (Troy) have been interpreted by some scholars as an attempt to reassert his own dynastic claim. This he probably did in concert with an application to the Great King of Hatti to be accepted into Hittite vassal status as a sub-king.

When his application was deprecated, he rebelled, wishing to assert his putative dynastic rights. The Great King of Hatti suppressed him through the agency of a certain other trusted vassal, Manapa-Tarhunta. Piyamaradu, on the other hand, allied with the Great King of Ahhiyawa (Achaea, i.e. Mycenean Greece), and married his daughter to Atpa, the vassal ruler of Millawanda (Miletus).

Because he had asserted himself against the Great King of Hatti, and allied himself with the Great King of Ahhiyawa, his characterization in the Hittite archives is that of "troublemaker", "adventurer", "freebooter", or "mercenary"; from his own point of view he may have considered himself merely to be asserting his own rightful (hereditary?) status.  The salience of his exploits in the record, together with his name and claim, render dynastic parameters plausible, but still entirely speculative.

Identification with Homeric personages 
Piyamaradu has been conjectured by some, to correspond to the archetype embodied in the epic/legendary Priam of Troy in the Iliad.

Hittite archives 
The relevant Hittite archival correspondence referring to him include:

Manapa-Tarhunta letter "...a notorious local troublemaker called Piyamaradu is harrying Wilusiya, a land of the Assuwa federation loosely allied with the Hittite Empire. The Hittite king has apparently ordered Manapa-Tarhunda to drive out Piyamaradu himself, but Manapa-Tarhunda's attempt has failed, so that a Hittite force is now sent out to deal with the problem."
Tawagalawa letter "The letter would be more appropriately known as the 'Piyama-Radu letter'".
Milawata letter "Like the Tawagalawa letter and also the Manapa-Tarhunta letter, the Milawata letter mentions the infamous adventurer Piyama-Radu; but as a figure of the past."
Letter from a King of Hatti (Hattusili III?) to another Great King. Includes a reference to Piyamaradu along with the King of Ahhiyawa, but the text is too fragmentary for interpretation.
 Votive Prayer of Puduhepa, consort of Hattusili III and chief priestess. Dated to the mid-thirteenth century B.C.E., Puduhepa has traveled to the sea to make an offering in return for the sea god's intervention in apprehending Piyamaradu. One other god is appealed to, but the reference to the god's name is fragmentary.

See also 

 Kingdom of Mira
 Luwians
 Madduwatta
 Seha River Land

References

Bibliography 

American Journal of Archaeology Online Forum: "The Importance of Troy in the Late Bronze Age 2005--03-10";
Heinhold-Krahmer, Susanne.
1986. "Untersuchungen zu Piyamaradu (Teil II)." Orientalia 55.47-62.
1983. "Untersuchungen zu Piyamaradu (Teil I)." Orientalia 52.81-97.
Gurney, Oliver 2002.  "The authorship of the Tawagalawas Letter." Silva Anatolica Vol. 2002, pp. 133–141.
Beckman, Gary M., Bryce, Trevor R., Cline, Eric H. The Ahhijawa Texts 2011, Atlanta, Society of Biblical Literature.
Hoffner, Harry A., and Beckman, Gary M., Letters from the Hittite Kingdom 2009, Atlanta, Society of Biblical Literature
 Max Gander (2014), An Alternative View on the Location of Arzawa.  Hittitology today: Studies on Hittite and Neo-Hittite Anatolia in Honor of Emmanuel Laroche’s 100th Birthday. Alice Mouton, ed. p. 163-190

External sites 
 Piyamaradu Università degli Studi di Firenze - sagas.unifi.it

13th-century BC rulers
People of the Trojan War
Priam